Weed Patch Hill, also known as Weed Patch Knob, is the third highest named summit in the U.S. state of Indiana.  Located in Washington Township and Brown County State Park, it is the highest point in the Knobstone Escarpment.

In Indiana, only Hoosier Hill in Wayne County and Sand Hill in Noble County are higher.

Weed Patch Hill was so named by an early settler after a tornado had flattened a stand of trees and weeds grew in its place.

References 

Hills of Indiana
Landforms of Brown County, Indiana